Aizpute Municipality is a former municipality in Courland, Latvia. The municipality was formed in 2009 by merging Aizpute town, Aizpute parish, Cīrava parish, Kalvene parish, Kazdanga parish and Laža parish the administrative centre being Aizpute. Aizpute Municipality ceased to exist on 1 July 2021, when it was merged into the newly-formed South Kurzeme Municipality.  The population in 2020 was 8,057.

Notable people
Latvian dissident and 2018 Nobel Peace Prize nominee Lidija Doroņina-Lasmane was born in Aizpute Municipality.

Twin towns — sister cities

Aizpute is twinned with:
 Schwerzenbach, Switzerland
 Karlskrona, Sweden

See also
 Administrative divisions of Latvia (2009)

References

 
Former municipalities of Latvia